Condensin complex subunit 3 also known as condensin subunit CAP-G (CAP-G) or non-SMC condensin I complex subunit G (NCAPG) is a protein that in humans is encoded by the NCAPG gene. CAP-G is a subunit of condensin I, a large protein complex involved in chromosome condensation.

Interactions 

NCAPG has been shown to interact with DNMT3B.

References

Further reading 

 
 
 
 
 

Human proteins